Suzanne Ciscele Landells (born 12 December 1964), known after marriage as Suzanne Dill-Macky, was an Australian individual medley swimmer of the 1980s, who won the silver medal in the 400-metre individual medley at the 1984 Summer Olympics in Los Angeles Olympics.  She was an Australian Institute of Sport scholarship holder.

Raised in Queensland, Landells was selected to represent Australia in the 400m individual medley, but was not expected to do well, barely scraping into the final. Although she was left far behind by the United States' Tracy Caulkins, she swum a personal best of 4 minutes 48.3 seconds to claim the silver medal.

Two years later at the 1986 Commonwealth Games in Edinburgh, Landells enjoyed more success, winning the 200-metre and 400-metre individual medley, and also breaking the 400-metre individual medley Commonwealth record.

See also
 List of Olympic medalists in swimming (women)

References

Bibliography
 
 Profile

1964 births
Living people
Olympic swimmers of Australia
People from Queensland
Swimmers at the 1984 Summer Olympics
Swimmers at the 1986 Commonwealth Games
Commonwealth Games gold medallists for Australia
Australian female medley swimmers
Australian Institute of Sport swimmers
Medalists at the 1984 Summer Olympics
Olympic silver medalists for Australia
Olympic silver medalists in swimming
Commonwealth Games medallists in swimming
20th-century Australian women
Medallists at the 1986 Commonwealth Games